James Molyneux Caulfeild, 3rd Earl of Charlemont KP (6 October 1820 – 12 January 1892) was an Irish politician and peer.

He was the son of Hon. Henry Caulfeild, younger son of James Caulfeild, 1st Earl of Charlemont, and Elizabeth Margaret Browne. Charlemont was educated at Trinity College, Cambridge. He was appointed High Sheriff of Armagh for 1842 and held the office of Whig Member of Parliament (MP) for County Armagh between 1847 and 1857. He was Lord Lieutenant of County Armagh between 1849 and 1864.

He succeeded to the title of 3rd Earl of Charlemont, amongst the other peerages, on 26 December 1863 on the death of his uncle Francis. He was Lord Lieutenant of County Tyrone between 1864 and 1892 and was made a Knight of St Patrick on 28 December 1865.

Lord Charlemont married on two occasions;
 Hon. Elizabeth Jane Somerville, daughter of William Meredyth Somerville, 1st Baron Meredyth and Lady Maria Harriet Conyngham, on 18 December 1856.
 Anna Lucy Lambart, daughter of Reverend Charles James Lambart and Marian Smith, on 10 May 1883 at the British Consulate, Pau, France.

He had no issue and the title died with him.

He died in Biarritz, France, and was buried in St Patrick's Cathedral, Armagh.

References

External links

|-

1820 births
1892 deaths
19th-century Irish people
Alumni of Trinity College, Cambridge
James
Earls in the Peerage of Ireland
Knights of St Patrick
Caulfield, James
Lord-Lieutenants of Armagh
Lord-Lieutenants of Tyrone
Caulfield, James
Caulfield, James
Caulfield, James
UK MPs who inherited peerages
High Sheriffs of Armagh
Viscounts Charlemont